WTYE 101.7 FM is a radio station broadcasting a classic hits format. Licensed to Robinson, Illinois, the station is owned by The Original Company, Inc.

WTYE has a construction permit to increase its effective radiated power from 3,100 watts to 12,000 watts, and upgrade its license from class A to B1.

References

External links
WTYE's website

TYE